Philippe Dupont (born 31 May 1958) is a French middle-distance runner. He competed in the 800 metres at the 1980 Summer Olympics and the 1984 Summer Olympics.

References

1958 births
Living people
Athletes (track and field) at the 1980 Summer Olympics
Athletes (track and field) at the 1984 Summer Olympics
French male middle-distance runners
Olympic athletes of France
Place of birth missing (living people)